AnyRoad is an American company that makes Experience Relationship Management (ERM) software for other companies. The AnyRoad platform technology provides data management, analytics and experiential marketing tools for online and in-person experiences.

The company's headquarters are in San Francisco, California with offices in Portland, Oregon and Athens, Greece.

History

AnyRoad was founded in 2014 by Jonathan Yaffe and Daniel Yaffe.

In April 2017, AnyRoad closed a seed round of funding of an undisclosed amount from investors including Marc Benioff.

In June 2019, AnyRoad raised $9.2 million in Series A round funding. Andreesen Horowitz’s David Ulevitch joined AnyRoad’s board of directors.

In March 2021, AnyRoad raised $10 million in Series A-1 financing led by Andreessen Horowitz.

In February 2022, AnyRoad raised a $47 million Series B round led by BlackRock.

References

2014 establishments in California
Companies based in San Francisco
American companies established in 2014
Internet properties established in 2014
Online companies of the United States
Event management companies of the United States
Privately held companies of the United States